Inka Pukara (Aymara Inka Inca, pukara fortress, "Inka fortress", also spelled Inca Pucara) is a mountain in the Bolivian Andes which reaches a height of approximately . It is located in the La Paz Department, Aroma Province, Patacamaya Municipality, northeast of Patacamaya.

References 

Mountains of La Paz Department (Bolivia)